Azerbaijan State Pedagogical University or short ASPU - state educational institution established for training pedagogical staff.

History 
The Azerbaijan State Pedagogical University named after Nasraddin Tusi was established in 1921 under Decree No. 66 "On the Organization of the Azerbaijan State Pedagogical Institute" dated August 26, 1921, signed by the Chairman of the Council of People's Commissars of Azerbaijan Nariman Narimanov. Its first graduation was in 1924. So far ASPU has prepared more than 100 thousand teachers. In 1972 the Institute was awarded the Order of the Red Banner of Labor.

Before its foundation, an Organizing Committee (Preparatory Commission) was created for the establishment of the institute in late 1920. Fatullah Bey Rzabeyli was appointed the Chairman of the Committee. The members were Habib Bey Mahmudbeyov and Rahim Jafarov. Abdulla Shaig, Muhammed bey Efendiyev, and Sadig Huseynov also took part in the activities of the committee. They also participated in the organization of the one-year pedagogical courses which played a key role in the establishment of the Pedagogical Institute in Azerbaijan and also delivered lectures in these courses.

The Organizing Committee was to prepare a curriculum for the institute and present it to the Azerbaijani People's State Education Commission, to find qualified personnel and to resolve the issue of teaching aids and construction. The Committee began its work on June 9, 1920.

On June 13, 1921, the Azerbaijani People's Education Commission approved the first statute of the Pedagogical Institute. The statute defines the structure, duties, and rights of the institution and also specifies the subject disciplines included in the curriculum, as well as the rules of the colloquium, acts of admission and examinations to strengthen the knowledge and control of students.

According to the curriculum, students in the first year were supposed to teach the subjects such as mathematics, Mother tongue, the Russian language, literature, music, etc. In the second year, students were divided into specialties and trained in accordance with the relevant subjects. On November 12, 1921, three days before the beginning of the classes the first meeting of the Council of the Institute was held at the Pedagogical Institute and questions were also discussed about the organization of lessons and other important tasks.

In the first years, the Institute trained teachers in the field of history, philology, chemistry, physics, and mathematics as well as theoretical courses and experimental studies in botany, zoology, physiology, chemistry, geology, and mineralogy. The students were educated within the framework of the program of the Baku State University by such teachers as F. Rasulzade, S. Huseynov, A. A. Amirov, S. Kh. Osinanzade. In this period the most powerful scientific center of the department was the faculty of physiology.

In 1921 the Department of History and Public Literature was established. The new department was responsible for teaching the humanitarian and special disciplines, philosophy, logic, pedagogy, didactics, political economy, the foundations of the state law and other subjects. From 1925 to 1926 the department was divided into two independent departments: the Department of History and the Department of Philology.

Between 1923 and 1924 the Ministry of Education of Azerbaijan allocated 112 thousand manats for educational, scientific and economic work of the institute. In those years, the Institute's basic library was also enriched. At the time of the library`s creation, there were just 50 books in the Azerbaijani language and 73 books in different languages. A few years later the library fund of German literature was significantly increased from Moscow and other cities. In the academic year 1923-24, there were 2,000 copies in Azerbaijani and 1,000 copies in the Russian language in the library.

From 1924-25 school years, the institute began to work with a 4-year curriculum. At that time, 142 students were studying at the university. Students from neighboring countries, such as Georgia, Kazakhstan, Uzbekistan, etc., also studied at this educational institution.

Famous graduates 
 Abramov Yevda - Azerbaijani statesman, deputy of Milli Majlis (Azerbaijani Parliament).
 Hamid Arasly - Soviet Azerbaijani scientist, literary critic, Doctor of Philology (1954), academician of the Academy of Sciences of Azerbaijan SSR (1968).
 Ahmad Javad - Azerbaijani poet, writer, journalist, author of the words Hymn of Azerbaijan.
 Budag Budagov  - Azerbaijani Soviet scientist, geographer, academician of the Academy of Sciences of the Azerbaijan SSR (1989), director of the Institute of Geography of ANAS.
 Ali Mammadov - Soviet and Azerbaijani arabist, orientalist, translator.
 Afat Gurbanov - doctor of philological sciences, professor, corresponding member of ANAS.
 Ibrahim Ibrahimov - mathematician, academician of the Academy of Sciences of the Azerbaijan SSR, professor, doctor of physical and mathematical sciences.
 Ilyas Afandiyev - People's Writer of Azerbaijan (1979).
 Avaz Sadig - Azerbaijani Soviet writer.

Structure of the University 
There are more than 7,000 students studying at the university. The University has 10 faculties such as Philological, Mathematical, Physical, Geographical, Historical, Artistic and Graphic Culture, Pedagogy, General Technical Disciplines and Labor, Chemical and Biological, Pre-school Pedagogy

Training is conducted in the specialties such Azerbaijan language and literature, History, Mathematics, Chemistry, Biology, Physics, Geography, Professional development, Music education, Initial military and physical training, Pedagogy and methodology of primary education, Pedagogy and methods of preschool education.

There are 330 teachers at 55 departments of the University, including 59 doctors of science, 329 candidates of science and associate professors, 4 full members of various academies of sciences. The University employs 730 people of support staff. The university includes a library and reading rooms, a computer room, an onomastic laboratory, a zoological museum, and a medical care center. There are more than 700 thousand copies in the library.

Branches 
Azerbaijan Pedagogical University has its branches in a number of cities such as Agjabadi, Guba, Jalilabad, Sheki, and Shamakhi.

The Agjabedi branch of the Azerbaijan Teachers' Institute was recognized as a branch of the Azerbaijan State Pedagogical University with the Presidential Decree dated November 26, 2015 No. 1582. Since 2012, the branch is headed by the candidate of philology, professor Farzalieva Matanat.

On June 14, 2000, the Guba branch was established on the basis of the Guba branch of the Azerbaijan State University of Culture and Arts with Decree No. 349 of president Heydar Aliyev.

Jalilabad branch was established on the basis of the Jalilabad Agricultural Technical School with the presidential decree dated June 13, 2000 "On improving the education system in the Republic of Azerbaijan". The head of the branch is Associate Professor, Ph.D. of Philosophy Khudayar Sultanly.

On June 14, 2000, by Decree No. 349 of the President of Azerbaijan, the Sheki Branch of the Azerbaijan Teachers` Institute was established on the basis of the Sheki branch of BSU and the Department for Advanced Training and Retraining of General Pedagogical Staff.

The Shamakhi branch of the Azerbaijan State Pedagogical University has been operating since 1991.

International relations 

On May 12–14, 2007, the Azerbaijan State Pedagogical University hosted an International Conference on "Teacher Training Policy and Problems" together with the Hacettepe University of the Republic of Turkey.

ASPU held a presentation on 21–24 April 2009 at the conference on "Building Civilizations through Education" organized by European Teacher Education Network (ETEN) at the Ege University of Turkey and was elected a member of the European Teacher Education Network.

On 2 February 2009, Scientific Cooperation Protocol between ASPU and Mehmet Akif Ersoy University of the Republic of Turkey was signed.

On 16–18 May 2010, ASPU and Hacettepe University jointly organized a conference titled "Symposium II of International Teacher Training Policy and Problems” in Ankara.

On 31 May 2011, the Babesh-Bolyai University of Romania and ASPU signed a cooperation agreement. By the decision of the Scientific Council of Azerbaijan State Pedagogical University rector of Babesh-Bolyai University, professor A.Margaya was awarded "Honorary Doctor" by ASPU.

A Mandate was signed between the Azerbaijan State Pedagogical University and the Qafqaz University to join the E-NOTES (European Computer Driving License) project on 7 February 2012.

On 1 June 2012, a Scientific and Technical Cooperation Agreement was signed between the ASPU and the Radio and Electronics Institute of Russian Academy of Sciences.

On 22 June 2012, a Protocol on academic cooperation was signed between ASPU and Hacettepe University of the Republic of Turkey.

On September 14, 2012, ASPU signed a cooperation agreement with the Kazakh National Pedagogical University named after Abay.

Roger Bruce Myerson, a member of the Second Baku International Humanitarian Forum, Professor of the University of Chicago, Nobel Prize winner in Economics, met with the faculty and staff of ASPU on October 5, 2012.

A Memorandum of Understanding on scientific cooperation was signed between Azerbaijan State Pedagogical University (ASPU) and Tashkent State Pedagogical University (TSPU) named after Nizami Ganjavi on December 28, 2013, in Baku.

Gallery

See also 
List of universities in Baku

Education in Azerbaijan

References

External links 
 http://www.beic.az/education_azerbaijan/azerbaijan_state_pedagogical_university.html
 https://www.navigator.az/en/firm/1206/info/
 https://azertag.az/en/xeber/1009792

Azerbaijan State Pedagogical University
Science and technology in Azerbaijan
Educational institutions established in 1921
1921 establishments in Azerbaijan
1921 establishments in Russia